Garhi may refer to several places:

 Garhi Abdullakhan
 Garhi Daulatzai
 Garhi Dupatta
 Garhi Habibullah
 Garhi Harsaru
 Garhi Ismail Zai
 Garhi Khuda Bakhsh
 Garhi Matani
 Garhi Pukhta
 Garhi Shahu
 Garhi Sher Ahmed
 Garhi Yasin
 Garhi, Banswara, a village and tehsil in Banswara, Rajasthan, India
 Garhi, Kaurali, a village in Karauli, Rajasthan, India
 Garhi Phulgran, misspelling of Ghari Phulgran

Garhi may also refer to:
 Australopithecus garhi, a gracile australopithecine species whose fossils were discovered in 1996 by a research team led by Ethiopian paleontologist Berhane Asfaw and Tim White, an American paleontologist